Aldulescu is a Romanian surname. Notable people with the surname include:

Radu Aldulescu (born 1954), Romanian writer
Radu Aldulescu (1922–2006), Romanian-born Italian cellist

Romanian-language surnames